Nicolas Ritz (born February 26, 1992) is a French ice hockey player who is currently playing for the Herning Blue Fox of the Metal Ligaen.

Ritz competed in the 2013 and 2014 IIHF World Championships as a member of the France men's national ice hockey team.

References

External links

1992 births
Living people
Ducs de Dijon players
French ice hockey centres
Herning Blue Fox players
HPK players
Lillehammer IK players
Rapaces de Gap players
Sportspeople from Dijon
French expatriate sportspeople in Finland
French expatriate sportspeople in Norway